Hechtia fragilis is a species of plant in the genus Hechtia. This species is endemic to Mexico.

References

fragilis
Flora of Mexico